Shaklak Mish Ghareeb is an Arabic television show based on the show Your Face Sounds Familiar. The first season premiered on 19 April 2014 on MBC 1 and Wanasah TV.

Season 1 

The judges on the show included
 Haifa Wehbe - Singer
 Hakim - Singer
 Mohammed Sami - Film and TV Director

And the show is presented by Lebanese comedian Tony Abou Jaoudeh.

The eight celebrity contestants who randomly take on different character transformation challenges every week on the show are: 
 Wael Mansour
 Tamer Abdulmonem
 Mais Hamdan
 Bassima
 Khaled Al Shaer
 Abdulmonem Amairy
 Dima Kandalaft
 Jennifer Grout

Episodes

Weekly statistics

Weekly assessments

References

External links
 All episodes on Panet.

2014 television series debuts
2014 television series endings
Arabic television series
Your Face Sounds Familiar